Robert Lee Howsam (February 28, 1918 – February 19, 2008) was an American professional sports executive and entrepreneur. In 1959, he played a key role in establishing two leagues—the American Football League, which succeeded and merged with the National Football League, and baseball's Continental League, which never played a game but forced expansion of Major League Baseball (MLB) from 16 to 20 teams in 1961–62. He also served as GM of the St. Louis Cardinals from August 17, 1964, until January 1967, where he inherited a team that would win the 1964 World Series, but made material contributions to the Redbirds' 1967 world champions and 1968 pennant-winners.

Born in Denver, Howsam attended the University of Colorado and served as a U.S. Navy pilot during World War II. He was the son-in-law of Edwin C. Johnson, a three-term United States Senator and two-term governor of Colorado. Johnson also was involved with professional baseball as founder and first president of the postwar Class A Western League, an upper-level minor league that played from 1947 to 1958.

Efforts to bring Major League Baseball to Denver
Howsam first made a name for himself as a highly successful baseball executive. He led the family-owned Denver Bears of the Western League and Triple-A American Association from 1947 to 1962. He built one of the most successful minor league franchises of the 1950s and was twice (1951 and 1956) named Minor League Executive of the Year by The Sporting News. Howsam, his brother Earl and his father Lee also built Bears Stadium, a minor league baseball park which, after renovation and expanded capacity, became famous as Mile High Stadium, the Denver Broncos' noisy, raucous and perpetually sold-out home from 1960 to 2001. While the Bears achieved great success as the top farm team of the New York Yankees in the late 1950s, an earlier stint as a low-level affiliate of the Pittsburgh Pirates (1952–54) served to introduce Howsam to Pirates' general manager Branch Rickey, the Baseball Hall of Fame executive, who had revolutionized baseball in his earlier career with the St. Louis Cardinals and Brooklyn Dodgers.  Rickey would play an influential role later in Howsam's career.

In an attempt to bring Major League Baseball to Denver, Howsam was one of the founders of the Continental League, which in 1959 planned to become the "third Major League" following the epidemic of franchise shifts during the 1950s. MLB magnates, nervous about the possible rescinding of baseball's antitrust exemption by the U.S. Congress after the National League abandoned New York City in 1958, agreed to study (and perhaps support) the formation of the new loop.  Howsam was slated to become owner of the Denver franchise, one of the league's eight charter members.  Howsam even went as far as to expand Bears Stadium to over 34,000.  Rickey, meanwhile, was elected president of the new circuit.

As events unfolded, the new league never got off the drawing board; it was doomed once three of its key cities gained Major League franchises in 1961 and 1962: New York and Houston were awarded expansion National League franchises in 1962, while the Washington Senators of the American League moved to Minneapolis-St. Paul as part of the Junior Circuit's 1961 expansion.

Founder of AFL and Denver Broncos
Howsam was now in a bind.  He had taken on a large amount of debt in hopes of bringing the majors to Denver.  However, there was little prospect of retiring it in the foreseeable future, as he was now saddled with a stadium far too big for a Triple-A team.  He concluded the only way to get additional revenue was to extend his stadium's season by bringing in a football team.

Howsam first sought an expansion NFL team for Denver.  When that bid was turned down, Bob Howsam met with Lamar Hunt in the lobby of The Brown Palace Hotel and founded the Denver Broncos—one of the eight charter members of the American Football League. (The Howsams and the seven other original owners called themselves the "Foolish Club" for daring to take on the established NFL.)

The Broncos played in the AFL from 1960 to 1969 and then joined the NFL with completion of the NFL/AFL merger in 1970. After a disastrous 4–9–1 season in 1960, the Howsam family sold controlling interest in the Broncos and Bears to Gerald and Alan Phipps in May 1961. The team would only get as high as .500 only three times its first 17 years, including when it joined the NFL in 1970.  But it was developing a loyal fan base, and since its first Super Bowl appearance in 1977, the Broncos have become one of the most successful operations in the NFL.

In St. Louis: A World Series champ in first year
After selling the Broncos, Howsam returned to baseball. In mid-August , with the Cardinals seemingly about to finish well behind the first-place Philadelphia Phillies, Busch fired general manager Bing Devine and replaced him with Howsam—reputedly at Rickey's urging. On August 17, the day of Howsam's hiring, St. Louis was in fifth place at 63–55, nine games behind Philadelphia.

However, the team Howsam inherited ended up winning 30 of its last 44 games—including eight in a row from September 24–30—and captured the NL pennant on the last day of the season, as the Phils collapsed. Then, behind Bob Gibson, they defeated the Yankees in the World Series.  During the victory celebration after the clinching seventh game, Howsam was given credit for the St. Louis turnaround. This rankled several of the players, most of whom felt Devine's acquisition of Lou Brock in June provided the final piece of the puzzle. Furthermore, Howsam did not have an opportunity to make major changes to the roster in his six weeks as general manager, which began two months after the June 15 trade deadline then in effect as the Cardinals' 25-man roster remained virtually the same from August 17 through the World Series.

Howsam's two full years as Cardinals' general manager (1965–66) failed to deliver a pennant, with St. Louis winning 80 and 83 games, respectively. Howsam installed popular Red Schoendienst as manager and he rebuilt the Redbirds infield, trading away veterans Ken Boyer, Bill White and Dick Groat in a bid for more pitching help. In 1966, Howsam acquired future Hall of Fame first baseman Orlando Cepeda from the San Francisco Giants in midseason and right fielder Roger Maris from the Yankees (in exchange for third baseman Charley Smith, acquired as part of the Boyer trade) during the winter interleague trading period. Howsam resisted making a big trade to replace Boyer, instead staying in house and moving long-time outfielder Mike Shannon to third base to replace Boyer. With Howsam's contributions, the Cardinals were poised to win back-to-back pennants in 1967–68. But in December 1966, a 13-member local ownership syndicate led by Francis L. Dale purchased the Cincinnati Reds; one month later, in January 1967, Howsam accepted its offer to become the club's new general manager.

In Cincinnati: Engineering the 'Big Red Machine'
In Cincinnati, Howsam flourished. During his 11 years (1967–77) as general manager, he was one of the key figures (along with his predecessor, Bill DeWitt, and his manager, Sparky Anderson) behind  "The Big Red Machine", which captured six division titles from 1970 to 1979, four NLCS titles, and two World Series championships in 1975 and 1976.

Although many key parts of the Reds' dynasty—such as Pete Rose, Johnny Bench, Tony Pérez, Lee May and Tommy Helms—were already in place or in the organization in 1966, Howsam boldly promoted young pitchers such as Gary Nolan, Don Gullett and Wayne Simpson to the Major Leagues. In 1970, he replaced a popular incumbent manager, Dave Bristol, with a then-unproven but a future Hall-of-Fame skipper in Anderson, whom Howsam had earlier hired as a manager in the Cardinals' and Reds' farm systems. He ensured that the fruitful Cincinnati system continued to churn out young position players, such as Dave Concepción, Ken Griffey, Ray Knight and Bernie Carbo. He also acquired record-setting reliever Wayne Granger and two talented young outfielders, Bobby Tolan and Alex Johnson, from the Cardinals. It was the second time that Howsam had traded for Johnson (the first was in 1965 while Johnson was a member of the Philadelphia Phillies), and he would ultimately trade Johnson away for pitchers Pedro Borbon and Jim McGlothlin (who would go on to win 14 games for the 1970 Reds).

Then, in two masterful 1971 trades, Howsam acquired second baseman Joe Morgan (in a deal that included May and Helms) from the Houston Astros and outfielder George Foster from the Giants (for utility infielder Frank Duffy). In Cincinnati, Morgan would win consecutive NL Most Valuable Player awards in 1975–76 and earn credentials as a member of the Hall of Fame. Foster won the 1977 NL MVP award as he hit 52 home runs for the Reds —the only player to crack the half-century HR mark in the 1970s or 1980s.

The 1976 Cincinnati club, which won 102 regular season games, then swept both the Phillies in the 1976 National League Championship Series and the Yankees in the 1976 World Series, is considered one of the strongest in baseball history. The Sporting News named Howsam Major League Executive of the Year for 1973—ironically, a season in which the powerhouse Reds dropped the NLCS to the underdog New York Mets.

Howsam reportedly had considerably more authority than most general managers of the time. The team's owners during his tenure (first Dale, then Louis Nippert) largely left the team's day-to-day operations in his hands, and he added the title of team president in 1973. He even represented the Reds at owners' meetings. Under his watch, the Reds were known for their strict policies on player appearance.  Players were not allowed to have facial hair (a policy that continued long after Howsam left the team) and were required to wear their uniform pants and socks in a specific fashion.  However, Howsam was especially known for his conservatism regarding labor relations; under him, the Reds were among the hardliners during the 1972 strike.

After the dynasty
While accepting the 1976 World Series trophy after the Reds' sweep of the Yankees, and with the advent of free agency, which marked that season, Howsam stated that there may never again be a collection of players like the 1976 Reds on a single MLB team. Howsam traded Tony Pérez to the Montreal Expos in the months following the 1976 title. Don Gullett left the Reds after the 1976 season and signed with the Yankees. The Reds finished second in the NL West to the Los Angeles Dodgers, despite Howsam engineering a big mid-season trade for future Hall of Fame pitcher Tom Seaver. Approaching his 60th birthday at the close of the 1977 season, Howsam turned over his general manager responsibilities to a longtime assistant, Dick Wagner. The Reds finished second to the Dodgers again in 1978 and Rose left via free agency in the winter of 1978. Wagner fired Sparky Anderson after the 1978 season after Anderson refused to fire key members of his coaching staff.

Howsam returned to the club presidency in 1983 replacing a fired Wagner. By then, the Reds were in last place of the NL West. Howsam traded for an aging Pete Rose in 1984 and installed him as a player-manager. Rose would become the all-time hits leader the next year, collecting hit No. 4,192 on Sept. 11, 1985, eclipsing a record set by the immortal Ty Cobb. Howsam was elected to the Cincinnati Reds Hall of Fame in 2004.

In retirement, Howsam served on the Colorado Baseball Commission, which succeeded in bringing the Colorado Rockies to Denver as an MLB expansion team in 1993—thus fulfilling his dream of bringing MLB to his hometown three decades after the death of the Continental League. He had been elected to his home state's Sports Hall of Fame in 1971.  He died from complications of heart disease on February 19, 2008, nine days short of his 90th birthday, at his Sun City, Arizona, home.

References

1918 births
2008 deaths
20th-century American businesspeople
American Football League owners
Businesspeople from Denver
Cincinnati Reds executives
Continental League contributors
Denver Broncos owners
Major League Baseball general managers
Major League Baseball team presidents
Minor league baseball executives
St. Louis Cardinals executives
United States Navy pilots of World War II